Caerphilly F.C. was a Welsh football team that played in the Southern League in the 1910s and 1920s. They were based in the town of Caerphilly, Glamorgan.

They joined the Southern League in 1913–14 and left the league at the end of the season after finishing in 14th position. They tried again in 1919–20 but left the league again after finishing bottom with just five points. They entered into the Welsh section of the league in 1922–23 but they were unable to complete their fixtures and the team disbanded.

References

External links
Southern League finishing positions by club, 1894–95 to 1919–20

Defunct football clubs in Wales
Southern Football League clubs
Sport in Glamorgan